Louise M. Antony is an American philosopher who is professor of philosophy at the University of Massachusetts, Amherst. She specializes in philosophy of mind, epistemology, feminist theory, and philosophy of language.

Education and career
Antony received a bachelor's in philosophy from Syracuse University in 1975,  after which she went to Harvard University for her doctorate, which she received in 1981. Her first academic position was at the University of Illinois, Urbana-Champaign, in 1980-81. She taught at Boston University from 1981 to 1983; Bates College from 1983 to 1986; North Carolina State University from 1986 to 1993; the University of North Carolina, Chapel Hill from 1993 to 2000; and the Ohio State University from 2000 to 2006, when she moved to the University of Massachusetts, Amherst.

In addition to her academic work, Antony has also spoken out about the oppressive climate for women in philosophy. She wrote one of a series of articles in the New York Times's Opinionator column in the fall of 2013, and in 2011 co-founded with Ann Cudd the Mentoring Project for Junior Women in Philosophy. In 2015-16 she served as president of the eastern division of the American Philosophical Association.

Philosophical work
In her work on the philosophy of mind, Antony stakes out a middle ground between eliminative materialists like Daniel Dennett, who deny the possibility of the existence of the mind, and groups such dualists and neutral monists, who look for nonphysical explanations of the mind. Antony is also a prominent proponent of analytic feminist philosophy, suggesting that earlier feminist philosophers overlooked the extent to which analytic philosophers had rejected the ideas of empiricists and rationalists, and thus misidentified analytic epistemology with empiricism.

She debated Christian apologist William Lane Craig in 2008 on the topic "Is God Necessary for Morality?".

Personal life

Louise Antony is married to fellow philosopher Joseph Levine and is the mother of Bay Area musician Rachel Lark.

Publications

Antony has written a number of peer-reviewed papers, book reviews, and essays. She has also edited and introduced three volumes: Philosophers Without Gods (Oxford University Press, 2007), a collection of essays by leading philosophers reflecting on their life without religious faith (3); Chomsky and His Critics, with Norbert Hornstein (Blackwell Publishing Company, 2003); and, with Charlotte Witt, A Mind of One's Own: Feminist Essays on Reason and Objectivity (Westview Press, 1993), which was expanded in 2002 in a second edition.

Other selected essays include "Natures and Norms", "Multiple Realization: Keeping it Real", "Atheism as Perfect Piety For the Love of Reason", "Everybody Has Got It: A Defense of Non-Reductive Materialism in the Philosophy of Mind", and, with Rebecca Hanrahan, "Because I Said So: Toward a Feminist Theory of Authority".

See also
List of Syracuse University people
List of Harvard University people
List of American philosophers

References

External links
Interview with Richard Marshall

Living people
Epistemologists
Feminist philosophers
Atheist philosophers
American women philosophers
Women's studies academics
Philosophers from Massachusetts
Presidents of the American Philosophical Association
American atheists
20th-century American philosophers
21st-century American philosophers
Philosophers of mind
Philosophers of language
Harvard University alumni
Syracuse University alumni
Year of birth missing (living people)
21st-century American women